Three Japanese warships have borne the name Tenryū:

 , a steam corvette of the Imperial Japanese Navy launched in 1883 and scrapped in 1912
 , a training support vessel of the Japan Maritime Self-Defense Force launched in 1999

References

Imperial Japanese Navy ship names
Japanese Navy ship names